Gilia diegensis is a species of flowering plant in the phlox family known by the common name coastal gilia.

It is native to southern California and Baja California, where it grows in forest and scrub habitat in the Transverse and Peninsular Ranges and the deserts to the east.

Description
Gilia diegensis produces a usually glandular, erect stem up to  centimeters tall. The plant forms a flat basal rosette of sharply lobed, deeply cut leaves each up to 7 centimeters long. There are smaller leaves on the stem which are lance-shaped and lined with teeth.

The inflorescence is a cluster of flowers with purple and yellow throats and white to lavender corolla lobes with protruding stamens tipped with blue anthers.

External links
Jepson Manual Treatment: Gilia diegensis
Gilia diegensis — U.C. Photo gallery

diegensis
Flora of California
Flora of Baja California
Flora of the California desert regions
Natural history of the California chaparral and woodlands
Natural history of the Peninsular Ranges
Natural history of the Transverse Ranges
~
~
Natural history of San Diego County, California
Flora without expected TNC conservation status